East Penn may refer to:
 Eastern Pennsylvania, also known as the Lehigh Valley
 East Penn School District in Emmaus, Pennsylvania
 East Penn Township, Carbon County, Pennsylvania
 East Pennsboro Township, Cumberland County, Pennsylvania